Between the 2012 Summer Olympics and traditional sports, many significant events occurred this year in Indian sports. Below is a timeline.

January
 M. Chitra wins the women's snooker title at the Manisha National Billiards and Snooker Championship.
 19–23 January: Rajasthan defeats Tamil Nadu for the 78th Ranji Trophy in cricket.
 28 January: In tennis, Leander Paes and Radek Štěpánek of the Czech Republic win the men's doubles at the Australian Open.
 28 January: Australia defeats India 4–0 in the Test Series in Australia.

February
 Ajay Mittal wins the shotgun gold medal at the 55th National Shooting Championships.
 18 February: The 2012 Summer Olympics Men's qualification 1 and 2012 Summer Olympics Women's qualification 1 begin in New Delhi.
 26 February: The South African women's field hockey team defeats the Indian women's team, qualifying for the London Olympics.
 26 February: The Indian men's field hockey team qualify for the London Olympics.
 29 February: The first season of World Series Hockey begins.

March
 M.C. Mary Kom and Laishram Sarita Devi are gold medalists at the Asian Women's Boxing Championship.
 March 3: Mahesh Bhupati and Rohan Bopanna win the doubles title at the Dubai Tennis Championships.
 5 March: The 2012 I-League 2nd Division Final Round in football begins.
 10 March: Rahul Dravid retires from international cricket after a 16-year career.
 13 March: In football, India is eliminated from the AFC Challenge Cup after losing three matches in the group stage.
 16 March: Cricketer Sachin Tendulkar scores his 100th international hundred against Bangladesh in the Asia Cup.

April
 2 April: Sher-e-Punjab wins the 2012 World Series Hockey final, defeating Pune Strykers 5–2.
 4 April: The Twenty20 cricket Indian Premier League begins.
 12 April: Shiva Thapa became the youngest Indian boxer to qualify for the Olympics.
 16 April: The 2012 I-League U20 begins.
 17 April: The 2012 I-League 2nd Division Final Round ends, with ONGC and United Sikkim promoted to the 2012–13 I-League.

May
 5 May: Archer Deepika Kumari wins her first World Cup individual recurve gold medal in Antalya, Turkey by defeating Korea's Lee Sung Jin in the final.
 2011–12 I-League football season ends.
 10 May: Viswanathan Anand defends his world chess championship title against Boris Gelfand from May 10–31.
 18 May: Mary Kom qualifies for the London Olympics.
 19 April: 2012 I-League U20 ends, with Pune F.C. U-20 champions.
 27 May: The 2012 Indian Premier League finals are held at the M.A. Chidambaram Stadium in Chennai. Kolkata Knight Raiders win, defeating two-time champion (and host) Chennai Super Kings.
 29 May - 2 June: First leg of the Indian Volley League

June
 4–8 June: Second leg of the Indian Volley League
 12–16 June: Third leg of the Indian Volley League
 20–24 June: Fourth leg of the Indian Volley League

July
 July 31: Gagan Narang wins a bronze medal in the men's 10m air rifle at the 2012 Summer Olympics.

August
 July 27 – August 12: India at the 2012 Summer Olympics:
 August 3: Vijay Kumar wins a silver medal in the 25m Men's rapid-fire pistol at the Olympics.
 August 4: Saina Nehwal wins the bronze medal in women's badminton singles at the Olympics, after opponent Wang Xin retired with a knee injury while leading 21–18, 1–0.
 August 8: Mary Kom wins the bronze medal in women's flyweight boxing at the Olympics.
 August 11: Yogeshwar Dutt wins the bronze medal in men's 60 kg freestyle wrestling at the Olympics.
 August 12: Sushil Kumar wins the silver medal in men's 66 kg freestyle wrestling at the Olympics.
 23–27 August: First test between India and New Zealand of New Zealand's tour of India 2012 at Rajiv Gandhi International Stadium in Hyderabad, India; India won by an innings and 115 runs.

September
 31 August – 4 September: Second test between India and New Zealand of New Zealand's tour of India at M Chinnaswamy Stadium in Bangalore
 2 September - India defeats Cameroon for its third consecutive football Nehru Cup.
 8 September: First T20 between India and New Zealand of New Zealand's tour of India at ACA-VDCA Stadium in Vishakhapatnam
 11 September: Second T20 between India and New Zealand of New Zealand's tour of India at MA Chidambaram Stadium in Chennai
 16 September: The India women's national football team win the 2012 SAFF Women's Championship.
 18 September – 7 October: Indian men's and women's cricket teams at the ICC World Twenty20 in Sri Lanka
 22 September: First season of the Elite Football League of India begins.

October
 28 October: Second Indian Grand Prix at Buddh International Circuit, Greater Noida; won by Germany's Sebastian Vettel of Red Bull Racing for the second time.

November
 15–19 November: First test between India and England of England's tour of India at Sardar Patel Stadium, Ahmedabad
 23–27 November: Second test between India and England of England's tour of India at Wankhede Stadium, Mumbai

December
 5–9 December: Third test of England's tour of India at Eden Gardens, Kolkata
 13–17 December: Fourth test of England's tour of India at Vidarbha Cricket Association Stadium, Nagpur
 20 December: First T20 of England's tour of India at Subrata Roy Sahara Stadium, Pune
 22 December: Second T20 of England's tour of India at Wankhede Stadium, Mumbai

Multi-sport events

Leagues

See also

 2012 in India
 India national football team's in 2012-13

References

2012 in Indian sport